Padampur tehsil is one of the Ten tehsils of the Ganganagar district in the north western Indian state of Rajasthan. It is located in the northern area of the district. The city of Padampur is the headquarters of the tehsil. Its north border touches Ganganagar tehsil. It has borders in the east with Sadulshahar Tehsil and with Hanumangarh district. The south-east border is with Suratgarh tehsil, the west by Raisinghnagar tehsil and north-west with Karanpur tehsil.

The waters of the Ganges Canal irrigate the farms of this tehsil. Punjabi and Bagri (a dialect of the Rajasthani language) are spoken. Padampur, Gajsinghpur,  Binjhbayla, Fakirwali and Ridmalsar are the main towns and the Village Delwan of the tehsil. Binjhbayla is a Sub Tehsil in Padampur

References

Sri Ganganagar district
Tehsils of Rajasthan